Leslie Gornstein is a Los Angeles-based freelance entertainment writer and reporter. Gornstein wrote the Answer B!tch column on E! Online  from 2004 to 2013. In March 2013, she began a blog and podcast called The Fame Fatale, in which she answers reader questions about Hollywood. She has had shows on XM Satellite and Sirius radio.

Career
After graduating in 1994 with a B.S. in journalism from Northwestern University, Gornstein started her work as a business reporter. She began covering entertainment news for US Weekly magazine.

Her 2004 Los Angeles Times article "A Jinx in a box?" "chronicled bizarre events associated with a small antique wooden cabinet that had been placed up for sale on eBay". Her story inspired Lionsgate and Sam Raimi's 2012 film The Possession.

Gornstein's work has also appeared in the Associated Press, Crain's Chicago Business, Los Angeles Times, the New York Post, Black Enterprise, the Wall Street Journal, Utne Reader and among many others.

Publications

References

External links
 The Fame Fatale Blog & Podcast
 

Living people
American women journalists
Year of birth missing (living people)
Northwestern University alumni
21st-century American women